Inverdruie  (Scottish Gaelic: Inbhir Dhrùidh) is a small rural hamlet, that lies 2 miles southeast of Aviemore, in the strath of the River Spey, in the west Cairngorms National Park,  in Badenoch and Strathspey, Inverness-shire, Scottish Highlands and is in the Scottish council area of Highland.

The single track B970 B road which connects Kingussie to Aviemore passes Inverdruie.

Gallery

References

Populated places in Badenoch and Strathspey